The 1963–64 Sussex County Football League season was the 39th in the history of Sussex County Football League a football competition in England.

Division One

Division One featured 17 clubs which competed in the division last season, no new clubs joined the division.

League table

Division Two

Division Two featured 13 clubs which competed in the division last season, along with two new clubs:
Portfield, joined from the West Sussex League
Ringmer, joined from the Brighton, Hove & District League

League table

References

1963-64
S